Boplicity is a jazz composition which has become a standard, composed by Cleo Henry and Gil Evans for the 1957 album Birth of the Cool. It was composed in the key of F major.

References

Jazz compositions in F major
Miles Davis